Sri Ramachandra Institute of Higher Education and Research (SRIHER), formerly Sri Ramachandra University (SRU), formerly Sri Ramachandra Medical College and Research Institute (SRMC & RI), is a private institute located in Porur, Chennai, India. SRIHER consists of nine constituent colleges and faculties with more than 6000 students. SRIHER was founded by Sri Ramachandra Education & Health Trust on September 11, 1985, by N. P. V. Ramasamy Udayar. It was founded as a medical college, and was awarded the deemed to be university status in September 1994.

Rankings

The National Institutional Ranking Framework (NIRF) ranked Sri Ramachandra Institute of Higher Education and Research 83 overall in India in 2022, 48 among universities 15 in the medical ranking and 31 in the pharmacy ranking.
It was ranked 1 among among private health science university in India in 2022 by India Today.

Academics 
The college offers the four and a half year M.B.B.S. course with a one-year compulsory rotating internship. There are 250 seats which are filled through NEET UG exam.

Postgraduate and doctoral courses 
SRIHER offers postgraduate courses in almost all subjects including surgery, medicine, gynecology etc. Similarly it offers a variety of Doctoral courses including MCh i Neurosurgery, Surgical oncology, Cardiac Surgery among others and DM in Cardiology, Neurology etc.

References

External links

Deemed universities in Tamil Nadu
Medical colleges in Tamil Nadu
Universities in Chennai
Hospitals in Chennai
Educational institutions established in 1985
1985 establishments in Tamil Nadu